Jef Van Campen (born 6 February 1934) is a Belgian post-impressionistic art painter. He is mostly known for his maritime paintings.

Jef Van Campen is most known for his maritime paintings (impressions of rivers, sea and of ships in the Antwerp harbour). His work also contains portraits and still life.

Personalia 
 Father: Constant Van Campen, art painter, repaired objects of art
 Mother: Housewife, mother of 5, 2 daughters, 3 sons (Jef was the oldest son)
 Married Isabelle van Thillo, 4 children, 3 girls and a boy

Biography 
 Born 6 February 1934 in Antwerp
 At the age of 13, accepted to the eveningclasses of the Royal Academy of Fine Arts Antwerp
 Completed secondary school at two colleges, St-Louis and St-Norbert in Antwerp
 Attended the famous Artistic Crafts School in the Londenstraat in Antwerp
 Completed military service
 Attended at the Academies of Berchem and Schoten
 Professional art painter since 1990.
 Working and living in Antwerp

Recognitions 
1976 : Selected for award for aquarel Lions Club Antwerp
1977 : Selected for award for art painter of the city Ronse
1978 : Selected for award 'Eugène Schmidt'- Anderlecht
1982 : Public prize aquarel – Lions Club Antwerp
1983 : 2nd Prize for aquarel – Lions Club Antwerp
1983 : Honorable mention – Lions Club Voorkempen
1985 : 1st Prize for aquarel – Lions Club Voorkempen
1986 : 1st Prize kunstwedstrijd – Antwerpen een wereld van transport – Willemsfonds
1986 : 1st prize in Novotel Antwerp North
1987 : Public Prize – aquarelcontest Lions Club Voorkempen

See also
Dutch wiki Article about Jef Van Campen

References

External links
 The Official site of Jef Van Campen
 Galerie Van Campen & Rochtus
 Brussels RWE Exposition
 Blackheath Gallery UK
 Extract from Siren, a maritime magazine, 2005
 Jef Van Campen at Elephant Parade 2008
 Latest Project of Jef Van Campen, in cooperation with Gazet Van Antwerpen and the City of Antwerp

Belgian painters
1934 births
Painters from Antwerp
Living people
Royal Academy of Fine Arts (Antwerp) alumni